NGC 7010 is a massive elliptical galaxy located about 365 million light-years from Earth in the constellation Aquarius. NGC 7010 was discovered by astronomer John Herschel on August 6, 1823 and was later listed by French astronomer Guillaume Bigourdan as IC 5082.

Physical characteristics
NGC 7010 has broad, plateau shaped shells of stars surrounding it. Its theorized that the shells formed from the accretion of another galaxy.

See also
 Elliptical galaxy
 NGC 4881
 List of NGC objects (7001–7840)

References

External links

Astronomical objects discovered in 1823
Aquarius (constellation)
IC objects
7010
-2-53-24
Elliptical galaxies
66039